The 1909 All-Ireland Senior Football Championship Final was the 22nd All-Ireland Final and the deciding match of the 1909 All-Ireland Senior Football Championship, an inter-county Gaelic football tournament for the top teams in Ireland.

Match

Summary
Kerry won by double scores, their scorers being as follows: Johnny Skinner (1–02); Paddy Mullane (0–03); Jack Kennelly (0–02); Tom Costello (0–01); Dick Fitzgerald

This was also the first Championship meeting of Kerry and Louth.

Details

References

Gaelic football
All-Ireland Senior Football Championship Finals
Kerry county football team matches
Louth county football team matches